The Kongabula were an indigenous Australian people of the state of Queensland.

Country
The Kongabula inhabited the steep forest areas of the Carnarvon Range and the headwaters of the Injune (Hutton) Creek and Dawson River north of their meeting point.

Alternative names
 Ongabula
 Khungabula

Notes

Citations

Sources

Aboriginal peoples of Queensland
Far North Queensland